Salvation (from Latin: salvatio, from salva, 'safe, saved') is the state of being saved or protected from harm or a dire situation. In religion and theology, salvation generally refers to the deliverance of the soul from sin and its consequences. The academic study of salvation is called soteriology.

Meaning 

In Abrahamic religions and theology, salvation is the saving of the soul from sin and its consequences. It may also be called deliverance or redemption from sin and its effects. Depending on the religion or even denomination, salvation is considered to be caused either only by the grace of God (i.e. unmerited and unearned), or by faith, good deeds (works), or a combination thereof. Religions often emphasize that man is a sinner by nature and that the penalty of sin is death (physical death, spiritual death: spiritual separation from God and eternal punishment in hell).

Judaism

In contemporary Judaism, redemption, refers to God redeeming the people of Israel from their various exiles. This includes the final redemption from the present exile.

Judaism holds that adherents do not need personal salvation as Christians believe. Jews do not subscribe to the doctrine of original sin. Instead, they place a high value on individual morality as defined in the law of God—embodied in what Jews know as the Torah or The Law, given to Moses by God on biblical Mount Sinai.

In Judaism, salvation is closely related to the idea of redemption, a saving from the states or circumstances that destroy the value of human existence. God, as the universal spirit and Creator of the World, is the source of all salvation for humanity, provided an individual honours God by observing his precepts. So redemption or salvation depends on the individual. Judaism stresses that salvation cannot be obtained through anyone else or by just invoking a deity or believing in any outside power or influence.

When examining Jewish intellectual sources throughout history, there is clearly a spectrum of opinions regarding death versus the afterlife. Possibly an over-simplification, one source says salvation can be achieved in the following manner: Live a holy and righteous life dedicated to Yahweh, the God of Creation. Fast, worship, and celebrate during the appropriate holidays.
By origin and nature, Judaism is an ethnic religion. Therefore, salvation has been primarily conceived in terms of the destiny of Israel as the elect people of Yahweh (often referred to as “the Lord”), the God of Israel.

In the biblical text of Psalms, there is a description of death, when people go into the earth or the "realm of the dead" and cannot praise God. The first reference to resurrection is collective in Ezekiel's vision of the dry bones, when all the Israelites in exile will be resurrected. There is a reference to individual resurrection in the Book of Daniel. It was not until the 2nd century BCE that there arose a belief in an afterlife, in which the dead would be resurrected and undergo divine judgment. Before that time, the individual had to be content that his posterity continued within the holy nation.

The salvation of the individual Jew was connected to the salvation of the entire people. This belief stemmed directly from the teachings of the Torah. In the Torah, God taught his people sanctification of the individual. However, he also expected them to function together (spiritually) and be accountable to one another. The concept of salvation was tied to that of restoration for Israel.

Christianity 

Christianity's primary premise is that the incarnation and death of Jesus Christ formed the climax of a divine plan for humanity's salvation. This plan was conceived by God before the creation of the world, achieved at the cross, and it would be completed at the Last Judgment, when the Second Coming of Christ would mark the catastrophic end of the world and the creation of a new world.

For Christianity, salvation is only possible through Jesus Christ. Christians believe that Jesus' death on the cross was the once-for-all sacrifice that atoned for the sin of humanity.

The Christian religion, though not the exclusive possessor of the idea of redemption, has given to it a special definiteness and a dominant position. Taken in its widest sense, as deliverance from dangers and ills in general, most religions teach some form of it. It assumes an important position, however, only when the ills in question form part of a great system against which human power is helpless.

According to Christian belief, sin as the human predicament is considered to be universal. For example, in  the Apostle Paul declared everyone to be under sin—Jew and Gentile alike. Salvation is made possible by the life, death, and resurrection of Jesus, which in the context of salvation is referred to as the "atonement". Christian soteriology ranges from exclusive salvation to universal reconciliation concepts. While some of the differences are as widespread as Christianity itself, the overwhelming majority agrees that salvation is made possible by the work of Jesus Christ, the Son of God, dying on the cross.

Variant views on salvation are among the main fault lines dividing the various Christian denominations, both between Roman Catholicism and Protestantism and within Protestantism, notably in the Calvinist–Arminian debate, and the fault lines include conflicting definitions of depravity, predestination, atonement, but most pointedly justification.

Salvation, according to most denominations, is believed to be a process that begins when a person first becomes a Christian, continues through that person's life, and is completed when they stand before Christ in judgment. Therefore, according to Catholic apologist James Akin, the faithful Christian can say in faith and hope, "I have been saved; I am being saved; and I will be saved."

Christian salvation concepts are varied and complicated by certain theological concepts, traditional beliefs, and dogmas. Scripture is subject to individual and ecclesiastical interpretations. While some of the differences are as widespread as Christianity itself, the overwhelming majority agrees that salvation is made possible by the work of Jesus Christ, the Son of God, dying on the cross.

The purpose of salvation is debated, but in general most Christian theologians agree that God devised and implemented his plan of salvation because he loves them and regards human beings as his children. Since human existence on Earth is said to be "given to sin," salvation also has connotations that deal with the liberation of human beings from sin, and the suffering associated with the punishment of sin—i.e., "the wages of sin are death."

Christians believe that salvation depends on the grace of God. Stagg writes that a fact assumed throughout the Bible is that humanity is in, "serious trouble from which we need deliverance…. The fact of sin as the human predicament is implied in the mission of Jesus, and it is explicitly affirmed in that connection." By its nature, salvation must answer to the plight of humankind as it actually is. Each individual's plight as sinner is the result of a fatal choice involving the whole person in bondage, guilt, estrangement, and death. Therefore, salvation must be concerned with the total person. "It must offer redemption from bondage, forgiveness for guilt, reconciliation for estrangement, renewal for the marred image of God."

Mormonism

According to doctrine of the Church of Jesus Christ of Latter-day Saints, the plan of salvation is God's plan to save, redeem, and exalt all humankind who chose, either in this life, or in the world of spirits of the dead, to accept the grace of Jesus Christ by exercising faith in Him, repenting of their sins, and by making and keeping sacred covenants (including baptism).  Since the vast majority of God's children depart this life without that opportunity, Christ's gospel is preached to the unbelieving spirits in spirit prison (1 Peter 3: 19) so that they might be judged by the same standards as the living and live by following God in their spirit form (1 Peter 4: 6). If they accept Christ, sincerely repent of their sins, and accept ordinances done on their behalf, they can, by the grace of Christ, receive salvation on the same terms as the living. For this reason, members of the Church of Jesus Christ of Latter-day Saints do vicarious work for the dead in sacred temples. The elements of this plan are drawn from various sources, including the Bible, Book of Mormon, Doctrine & Covenants, Pearl of Great Price, and numerous statements made by the leadership of The Church of Jesus Christ of Latter-day Saints (LDS Church).

Islam

In Islam, salvation refers to the eventual entrance to Paradise. Islam teaches that people who die disbelieving in God do not receive salvation. It also teaches that non-Muslims who die believing in God but disbelieving in His message (Islam), are left to His will. Those who die believing in the one God and His message (Islam) receive salvation.

Narrated Anas, that Muhammad said:

Islam teaches that all who enter into Islam must remain so in order to receive salvation.

For those who have not been granted Islam or to whom the message has not been brought:

Tawhid

Belief in the “One God”, also known as the Tawhid in Arabic, consists of two parts (or principles):
 Tawḥīdu r-Rubūbiyya: Believing in the attributes of God and attributing them to no other but God. Such attributes include Creation, having no beginning, and having no end. These attributes are what make a God. Islam also teaches no less than 99 names for God, and each of these names defines one attribute. One breaks this principle, for example, by believing in an Idol as an intercessor to God. The idol, in this case, is thought of having powers that only God should have, thereby breaking this part of Tawheed. No intercession is required to communicate with, or worship, God.
 Tawḥīdu l-'ulūhiyya: Directing worship, prayer, or deed to God, and God only. For example, worshiping an idol or any saint or prophet is also considered Shirk.

Sin and repentance

Islam also stresses that in order to gain salvation, one must also avoid sinning along with performing good deeds. Islam acknowledges the inclination of humanity towards sin. Therefore, Muslims are constantly commanded to seek God's forgiveness and repent. Islam teaches that no one can gain salvation simply by virtue of their belief or deeds, instead it is the Mercy of God, which merits them salvation, as we have to know that by the mercy of god we are doing the good deeds and we are believing in God. However, repentance must not be used to sin any further. Islam teaches that God is Merciful.

Islam describes a true believer to have Love of God and Fear of God. Islam also teaches that every person is responsible for their own sins. The Quran states;

Al-Agharr al-Muzani, a companion of Muhammad, reported that Ibn 'Umar stated to him that Muhammad said,

Sin in Islam is not a state, but an action (a bad deed); Islam teaches that a child is born sinless, regardless of the belief of his parents, dies a Muslim; he enters heaven, and does not enter hell.

Five Pillars

Islam is built on five principles, acts of worship that Islam teaches to be mandatory. Not performing the mandatory acts of worship may deprive Muslims of the chance of salvation. According to Ibn 'Umar, Muhammad said that Islam is based on the following five principles:

 To testify that none has the right to be worshipped but Allah and Muhammad is Allah's Apostle.
 To offer the compulsory prayers dutifully and perfectly.
 To pay Zakat to poor and needy (i.e. obligatory charity of 2.5% annually of surplus wealth).
 To perform Hajj. (i.e. Pilgrimage to Mecca)
 To observe fast during the month of Ramadhan.

Indian religions 

Hinduism, Buddhism, Jainism and Sikhism share certain key concepts, which are interpreted differently by different groups and individuals. In these religions one is not liberated from sin and its consequences, but from the saṃsāra (cycle of rebirth) perpetuated by passions and delusions and its resulting karma. They differ however on the exact nature of this liberation.

Salvation is always self-attained in Dharmic traditions, and a more appropriate term would be moksha ('liberation') or mukti ('release'). This state and the conditions considered necessary for its realization is described in early texts of Indian religion such as the Upanishads and the Pāli Canon, and later texts such the Yoga Sutras of Patanjali and the Vedanta tradition. Moksha can be attained by sādhanā, literally 'means of accomplishing something'. It includes a variety of disciplines, such as yoga and dhyana (meditation).

Nirvana is the profound peace of mind that is acquired with moksha. In Buddhism and Jainism, it is the state of being free from suffering. In Hindu philosophy, it is union with the Brahman (Supreme Being). The word literally means 'blown out' (as in a candle) and refers, in the Buddhist context, to the blowing out of the fires of desire, aversion, and delusion, and the imperturbable stillness of mind acquired thereafter.

In Theravada Buddhism the emphasis is on one's own liberation from samsara. The Mahayana traditions emphasize the bodhisattva path, in which "each Buddha and Bodhisattva is a redeemer," assisting the Buddhist in seeking to achieve the redemptive state. The assistance rendered is a form of self-sacrifice on the part of the teachers, who would presumably be able to achieve total detachment from worldly concerns, but have instead chosen to remain engaged in the material world to the degree that this is necessary to assist others in achieving such detachment.

Jainism

In Jainism, salvation, moksha, and nirvana are one and the same.  When a soul (atman) achieves moksha, it is released from the cycle of births and deaths, and achieves its pure self. It then becomes a siddha ('one who has accomplished his ultimate objective'). Attaining Moksha requires annihilation of all karmas, good and bad, because if karma is left, it must bear fruit.

See also 

 Antinomianism
 Assurance (theology)
 Baptism
 Born again
 Collective salvation
 Divine filiation
 Easter
 Enlightenment (spiritual)
 Gnosis
 Heaven
 Henosis
 Legalism (theology)
 Penance
 Perseverance of the saints
 Prevenient grace
 Repentance
 Regeneration (theology)
 Sanctification
 Soteriology
 Steps to Christ
 Total depravity

References

Sources 

 
 
  (Presentation)

Further reading

External links 

 A. J. Wallace and R. D. Rusk, "Moral Transformation: the Original Christian Paradigm of Salvation" A recent defence of the moral transformation perspective.
 The last salvation - Thought provoking story
 , a sermon by John Wesley (Methodist / Wesleyan perspective)
 
 "God's Plan of Salvation" (conservative Evangelical perspective)
 Salvation in Islam
 Immortality Or Resurrection? Chapter VI Hell: Eternal Torment or Annihilation? by Samuele Bacchiocchi, Ph.D., Andrews University
 Redemption after Death by Charles Augustus Briggs: An article in the December 1889 Issue of The Magazine of Christian Literature Vol 1. No. 3.
 

 
Religious terminology